Connie Kay Nass is an American politician from the state of Indiana. A member of the Republican Party, she served in  various local level positions before serving as Indiana State Auditor from 1999 to 2007.

Political career
In 1980, Nass was elected to Huntingburg Common Council and served two terms.

In 1987, Nass was elected mayor of Huntingburg, defeating six-term Democratic incumbent Dale Helmerich. She served for two terms, and was succeeded in 1996 by Republican candidate Gail Kemp, with no Democrats contesting the election.

Nass retired from politics in 2007 after serving as Indiana State Auditor for eight years. She was accused by Democrats of "injecting partisan rhetoric" into the typically-neutral role due to her criticisms of Democratic governor Frank O'Bannon.

Nass later served as chairwoman of Indiana's Abraham Lincoln Bicentennial Commission.

Honours
In 1990, she was awarded the Protect Our Woods Award. In 2005, she was granted an honorary doctorate in humanities from Oakland City University. In 2006, the Association of Government Accountants gave her an award for exemplary performance. In December of the same year, she was awarded the Sagamore of the Wabash by Indiana governor Mitch Daniels.

Personal life
Nass and her husband, Alan, have two sons (Andy and Stephen) and a daughter (Susan). Her family run a funeral home called Nass & Son. They are members of Salem United Church of Christ in Huntingburg.

References

External links
 Project Vote Smart – Connie Kay Nass (IN) profile

Living people
Indiana Republicans
Indiana State Auditors
Women in Indiana politics
Year of birth missing (living people)
21st-century American women